Paragrapsus is a genus of crabs from South Eastern Australia, containing the following species:

Paragrapsus gaimardii (H. Milne-Edwards, 1837)
Paragrapsus laevis (Dana, 1851)
Paragrapsus quadridentatus (H. Milne-Edwards, 1837)
Paragrapsus urvillei (H. Milne-Edwards, 1853) was later referred to as part of the genus Helice by Tesch in 1918, but is listed as the accepted name by others.

References 

Grapsoidea
Fauna of Australia